Horacio Simaldone (born August 7, 1958 in Buenos Aires, Argentina) is a former Argentine footballer who played for clubs of Argentina and Chile.

Teams
San Lorenzo 1977–1978
Unión Española 1979–1982
Colo-Colo 1983–1985
O'Higgins 1986–1987
San Marcos de Arica 1988
Everton 1989–1993

Titles
Colo-Colo 1983 (Chilean Championship), 1985 (Copa Polla Gol(Today Copa Chile))

References
 Profile at BDFA 

1958 births
Living people
Argentine footballers
Argentine expatriate footballers
Footballers from Buenos Aires
San Lorenzo de Almagro footballers
Colo-Colo footballers
Unión Española footballers
San Marcos de Arica footballers
Everton de Viña del Mar footballers
O'Higgins F.C. footballers
Expatriate footballers in Chile
Argentine expatriate sportspeople in Chile
Association footballers not categorized by position